Serixia inconspicua is a species of beetle in the family Cerambycidae. It was described by Gardiner in 1936.

References

Serixia
Beetles described in 1936